Nicholas Sheran Park Disc Golf Course is a public 18-hole disc golf course located in Nicholas Sheran Park, in Lethbridge, Alberta, Canada. It was designed by Craig Burrows-Johnson and originally built for the 2001 Alberta Seniors Games. The course is available to the public at no charge, on a first-come, first-served, walk-on basis.

Tournaments 
As the home course of the Bridge City Gunners Disc Golf Club, the course hosted the 2-day, B-tier Spring Runoff competition in 2019. The event is part of the Alberta Tour Series.

See also 
List of disc golf courses in Alberta

References

External links 

 
 Official map
 DG Course Review profile
 PDGA course directory profile

Disc golf courses in Alberta
Sports venues in Lethbridge